Xylomya simillima is a species of fly in the family Xylomyidae.

Distribution
United States.

References

Xylomyidae
Insects described in 1947
Taxa named by George C. Steyskal
Diptera of North America